Corinth, Georgia may refer to the following places in the U.S. state of Georgia:
Corinth, Georgia, an unincorporated community and former town in Coweta and Heard counties
Corinth, Sumter County, Georgia, a ghost town
Corinth, Walker County, Georgia, an unincorporated community